Eric Bennett is an Australian former rugby league footballer who played in the 1940s.

Bennett played over 100 games for Western Suburbs from 1941 to 1949, He captained Wests and played at centre in their 1948 NSWRFL season's premiership final victory over Balmain.  Australian Rugby League Hall of Famer Keith Holman has credited Bennett, who helped him sign with Wests, as being a great influence on his career.

References

Living people
New South Wales rugby league team players
City New South Wales rugby league team players
Australian rugby league players
Western Suburbs Magpies players
Rugby league players from New South Wales
Rugby league five-eighths
Rugby league centres
Year of birth missing (living people)